María Aurelia Bisutti (June 20, 1930 – April 12, 2010) was an Argentine film and TV actress, with over 50 Argentine cinema and television credits between 1948 and 1993, as well as numerous roles in the theatre.

Biography
Born in Buenos Aires, she received her first film roles in 1948 through a radio audition hosted by a popular variety show of the time, Diario del cine, and first worked with directors Benito Perojo and Carlos Schlieper. Bisutti earned her first television role in a 1960 documentary on the lives of Paul Gauguin and Edgar Degas. She was given the lead role in Pedro Escudero's A puerta cerrada (1962), and starred in period piece filmmaker Leopoldo Torre Nilsson's Martín Fierro (1968). Bisutti also became well known on the radio, starring in a number of soap operas.

She received a Martín Fierro Award for lifetime achievement in 1999. She continued to work on the airwaves, starring in the public radio series, Las dos carátulas, from 2002.

Filmography
 1997: De cara al cielo (Enrique Dawi)
 1981: Seis pasajes al infierno (Fernando Siro)
 1980: El diablo metió la pata (Carlos Rinaldi)
 1975: El inquisidor (Bernardo Arias)
 1976: Allá donde muere el viento (Fernando Siro)
 1977: La nueva cigarra (Fernando Siro)
 1972: Nino (Federico Curiel)
 1970: Con alma y vida (David José Kohon)
 1969: Kuma Ching (dir. Daniel Tinayre)
 1968: Martín Fierro (Leopoldo Torre Nilsson)
 1968: El derecho a la felicidad (Carlos Rinaldi)
 1968: Lo prohibido está de moda (Fernando Siro)
 1966: Hotel alojamiento (Fernando Ayala)
 1965: Canuto Cañete, detective privado (Leo Fleider)
 1963: La calesita (Hugo del Carril)
 1962: A puerta cerrada (Pedro Escudero)
 1961: Amorina (Hugo del Carril)
 1961: Libertad bajo palabra (Alfredo Bettamín)
 1960: Los de la mesa 10 (Simón Feldman)
 1960: Culpable (Hugo del Carril)
 1960: Plaza Huincul (Pozo Uno) (Lucas Demare)
 1958: Alto Paraná (Catrano Catrani)
 1957: Historia de una carta (Julio Porter)
 1956: Sangre y acero (Lucas Demare)
 1954: Los ojos llenos de amor (Carlos Schlieper)
 1948: White Horse Inn (Benito Perojo)
 1948: La serpiente de cascabel (Carlos Schlieper)

References

External links

1930 births
2010 deaths
Actresses from Buenos Aires
Argentine radio personalities
Argentine film actresses
Argentine television actresses
20th-century Argentine actresses